HMS Exeter was a 70-gun third rate ship of the line of the Kingdom of England, built by contract Sir Henry Johnson at Blackwall under the 1677 Construction Programme. She was at the Battle of Beachy Head in 1690. She was accidentally burnt at Plymouth in 1691. Her remains were hulked at Portsmouth until she was broken in 1717.

She was the first vessel to bear the name Exeter in the English and Royal Navy.

Construction and Specifications
She was ordered on 20 February 1678 to be built under contract by Sir Henry Johnson of Blackwall on the River Thames. She was launched in March 1680. Her builder’s measure tonnage was calculated as 1,031 tons burthen.

Her initial gun armament was in accordance with the 1677 Establishment with 72/60 guns consisting of twenty-six demi-cannons (54 cwt, 9.5 ft) on the lower deck, twenty-six 12-pounder guns (32 cwt, 9 ft) on the upper deck, ten sakers (16 cwt, 7 ft) on the quarterdeck and four sakers (16 cwt, 7 ft) on the foc’x’le with four 3-pounder guns (5 cwt, 5 ft) on the poop deck or roundhouse. By 1688 she would carry 70 guns as per the 1685 Establishment . Her initial manning establishment would be for a crew of 460/380/300 personnel.

Commissioned Service

HMS Exeter was commissioned on 8 June 1679 under the command of Captain John Perryman for delivery to Chatham. In 1689 she was under the command of Captain Lawrence Wright followed by Captain Mathew Tennant. Under Captain George Mees in 1690. She fought in the Battle of Beachy Head in Rear (Blue) Squadron on 30 June 1690.

Loss
She was burnt by accident at Plymouth on 12 September 1691. Her remains were hulked at Portsmouth until she was broken in 1717.

Citations

References

 Colledge (2020), Ships of the Royal Navy, by J.J. Colledge, revised and updated by Lt Cdr Ben Warlow and Steve Bush, published by Seaforth Publishing, Barnsley, Great Britain, © 2020,  (EPUB), Section E (Exeter)
 Winfield (2009), British Warships in the Age of Sail (1603 – 1714), by Rif Winfield, published by Seaforth Publishing, England © 2009, EPUB 
 Lavery, Brian (2003) The Ship of the Line - Volume 1: The Development of the Battlefleet 1650-1850. Conway Maritime Press. 
 Clowes (1898), The Royal Navy, A History from the Earliest Times to the Present (Vol. II). London. England: Sampson Low, Marston & Company, © 1898

Ships of the line of the Royal Navy
1680s ships
Ships built by the Blackwall Yard